The Ministry of Popular Power for Communication and Information (Minci) is a public ministry of the Government of Venezuela dedicated to communication, informing the Venezuelan public and promoting the Venezuelan government.

Structure
Minister of Popular Power for Communication and Information
General Directorate Office
General Directorate of Presidential Communications
Vice Minister of Communication and Information
Vice Minister of Television
Vice Minister of Radio
Vice Minister of Print Media
Vice Minister of Social Networks

Organs and Affiliated Entities Ministry
National Commission of Telecommunications
Bolivarian Communication and Information System

Affiliated media organizations
Affiliated media organizations include:

Ministers

Censorship
The Institute Press and Society (Ipys) has criticized freedom of information and expression in Venezuela, though the Ministry of Popular Power for Communication and Information responded to these allegations by criticizing the Ipys report due to its alleged funding from United States organizations, such as the National Endowment for Democracy.

See also
Bolivarian propaganda
Censorship in Venezuela
The Commission of Propaganda, Agitation and Communication of the PSUV
Media in Venezuela

References

Government ministries of Venezuela
Communications ministries
Information ministries
Venezuelan propaganda organizations